Hsu Chia-lin (born 29 February 1992) is a Taiwanese taekwondo practitioner. Hsu won the silver medalist at the 2013 World Taekwondo Championships in the men's finweight (under 54 kg) class. He won African Champion  Hussein Sherif of Egypt in the semifinals
 but lost to Kim Tae-Hun of South Korea 7-0 in the final bout.

References

External links
 

1992 births
Living people
Taiwanese male taekwondo practitioners
Asian Games medalists in taekwondo
Taekwondo practitioners at the 2010 Asian Games
Asian Games bronze medalists for Chinese Taipei
Medalists at the 2010 Asian Games
Universiade medalists in taekwondo
Universiade silver medalists for Chinese Taipei
World Taekwondo Championships medalists
Medalists at the 2011 Summer Universiade
21st-century Taiwanese people